Wysox Township is one of twelve townships in Carroll County, Illinois, USA.  As of the 2020 census, its population was 1,324 and it contained 641 housing units.

Geography

Cities, towns, villages
 Milledgeville

Cemeteries
The township contains these three cemeteries: Bethel, Dutchtown Brethren and Union.

Major highways
  Illinois Route 40

Demographics
As of the 2020 census there were 1,324 people, 565 households, and 331 families residing in the township. The racial makeup of the township was 92.90% White, 0.53% African American, 0.00% Native American, 0.30% Asian, 0.00% Pacific Islander, 1.06% from other races, and 5.21% from two or more races. Hispanic or Latino of any race were 2.27% of the population.

There were 565 households, out of which 28.00% had children under the age of 18 living with them, 47.43% were married couples living together, 5.13% had a female householder with no spouse present, and 41.42% were non-families. 36.10% of all households were made up of individuals, and 16.10% had someone living alone who was 65 years of age or older. The average household size was 2.21 and the average family size was 2.84.

The township's age distribution consisted of 25.9% under the age of 18, 10.0% from 18 to 24, 22.2% from 25 to 44, 20.3% from 45 to 64, and 21.7% who were 65 years of age or older. The median age was 35.8 years. For every 100 females, there were 104.9 males. For every 100 females age 18 and over, there were 104.6 males.

The median income for a household in the township was $44,777, and the median income for a family was $72,321. Males had a median income of $38,654 versus $32,328 for females. The per capita income for the township was $28,843. About 10.6% of families and 15.4% of the population were below the poverty line, including 23.6% of those under age 18 and 2.2% of those age 65 or over.

School districts
 Chadwick-Milledgeville Community Unit School District 399

Political districts
 Illinois' 16th congressional district
 State House District 89
 State Senate District 45

References
 
 United States Census Bureau 2007 TIGER/Line Shapefiles
 United States National Atlas

External links
 City-Data.com
 Illinois State Archives
 Carroll County official site

Townships in Carroll County, Illinois
Townships in Illinois